Kejyonuma Dam is an earthen dam in the city of Ōsaki, Miyagi Prefecture, Japan, completed in 1995. The dam crosses the Tajiri River, a branch of the Kitakami River and utilises the basin of a pre-existing natural lake.

A 34 hectare portion of the wetlands at Lake Kejyonuma has been protected since October 2008 as a Ramsar site in Japan.

References 

Dams in Miyagi Prefecture
Dams completed in 1995
Ōsaki, Miyagi
Ramsar sites in Japan